The Eden Creek, a perennial stream of the Richmond River catchment, is located in Northern Rivers region in the state of New South Wales, Australia.

Location and features
The river descends  over its  course.

See also

 Rivers of New South Wales
 List of rivers of New South Wales (A-K)
 List of rivers of Australia

References

External links
 

 

Northern Rivers
Rivers of New South Wales
Kyogle Council